The following is a list of characters that first appeared in the New Zealand soap opera Shortland Street in 1997, by order of first appearance.

Marion Seymour

Marion Seymour (née Daniels) appeared in a guest stint in 1997. She first appeared in mid-1997 when she pressured her son, Ian (David Press) into having a family so as to continue the Seymour empire. Her daughter Margaret was unable to do so due to her sexuality. After discovering the truth, she attempted to expose Ian's dodgy business dealings concerning faulty heart valves and attempts at overtaking the hospital, to his partner, Jenny (Maggie Harper). However whilst arguing with Ian, she suffered a heart attack and died, with no attempts of help from Ian.

References

1997
, Shortland Street